is a Japanese manga artist and illustrator. Takarai started her career illustrating covers for novels in 2004 and later debuted as a manga artist in 2007 with Seven Days. She also publishes  manga under the pseudonym Octo.

Works

Series

Artbooks

Design credits

References 

Living people
Year of birth missing (living people)
Manga artists
Women manga artists
Japanese female comics artists
Female comics writers
Japanese women writers